Dinesh Pratap Singh (born 3 October 1967) is an Indian politician (with few criminal complains) and a member of the Bharatiya Janata Party (BJP). In 2019, he was linked in a political rivalry after a deadly attack on young local female politician Aditi Singh.

He was elected as the member of the Uttar Pradesh Legislative Council two times between 2010-2019 and contested for the 16th Lok Sabha Elections against congress chief Sonia Gandhi from Raebareli (Lok Sabha constituency) and received maximum votes as compared to any other BJP candidate in the history. He is also a key political leader behind victory of BJP in Jila Panchayat Results in Raebareli (Lok Sabha Constituency). 

Aside from various development initiatives, he supported Ram Mandir, Ayodhya with a donation amount of 1.21 cr.

He recently had an argument with Priyanka Gandhi on a flight from Delhi to Lucknow where the general secretary of the All India Congress Committee in charge of Uttar Pradesh said "you will not be able to take our seat so soon".

Political career

References

People from Raebareli
Uttar Pradesh politicians
Members of the Uttar Pradesh Legislative Council
Bharatiya Janata Party politicians from Uttar Pradesh
1967 births
Living people